"Bluffin" is a song by Swedish singer Liamoo, released as a single on 26 February 2022. It was performed in Melodifestivalen 2022 and made it to the final on 12 March 2022.

Track listing

Charts

References

2022 songs
2022 singles
Melodifestivalen songs of 2022